Philip Ballantyne Kerr (22 February 1956 – 23 March 2018) was a British author, best known for his Bernie Gunther series of historical detective thrillers.

Early life
Kerr was born in Edinburgh, Scotland, where his father was an engineer and his mother worked as a secretary.  He was educated at a grammar school in Northampton. He studied at the University of Birmingham from 1974 to 1980, gaining a master's degree in law and philosophy. Kerr worked as an advertising copywriter for Saatchi & Saatchi before becoming a full-time writer in 1989. In a 2012 interview, Kerr noted that he began his literary career at the age of twelve by writing pornographic stories and lending them to classmates for a fee.

Career
A writer of both adult fiction and non-fiction, he is known for the Bernhard "Bernie" Gunther series of 14 historical thrillers set in Germany and elsewhere during the 1930s, the Second World War and the Cold War. He also wrote children's books under the name P. B. Kerr, including the Children of the Lamp series. Kerr wrote for The Sunday Times, the Evening Standard, and the New Statesman. He was married to fellow novelist Jane Thynne; they lived in Wimbledon, London, and had three children. Just before he died, he finished a 14th Bernie Gunther novel, Metropolis, which was published posthumously, in 2019.

Awards and honours
In 1993, Kerr was named in Granta's list of Best Young British Novelists. In 2009, If the Dead Rise Not won the world's most lucrative crime fiction award, the RBA Prize for Crime Writing worth €125,000. The book also won the British Crime Writers' Association's Ellis Peters Historic Crime Award that same year. His novel, Prussian Blue, was longlisted for the 2018 Walter Scott Prize.

Death 
Kerr died at age 62 from bladder cancer on 23 March 2018.

Publications

Novels

Bernie Gunther 
 "Berlin Noir" "Bernie Gunther" trilogy, republished 1993 by Penguin Books in one volume. .
March Violets. London: Viking, 1989. , set in 1936
The Pale Criminal. London: Viking, 1990. , set in 1938
A German Requiem. London: Viking, 1991. , set in 1947–48
 Later "Bernie Gunther" novels
The One from the Other. New York: Putnam, 2006. , set in 1949 (intro set in 1937)
A Quiet Flame. London: Quercus, 2008. , set in 1950 and 1932-33
If the Dead Rise Not. London: Quercus, 2009. , set in 1934 and 1954
Field Grey. (Field Gray in USA) London: Quercus, 2010. , set in 1954 with flashbacks from 1941, 1931, 1940, & 1945/46.

Prague Fatale. London: Quercus, 2011 , set in 1941
A Man Without Breath. London: Quercus, 2013. , set in 1943
The Lady from Zagreb. London: Quercus, 2015. , set in 1942–3, with framing scenes in 1956.
The Other Side of Silence. London: Quercus, 2016. , set in 1956
Prussian Blue. London: Quercus, 2017. , set in 1939, with framing scenes in 1956
Greeks Bearing Gifts. London: Quercus, 2018. , set in 1957
Metropolis. London: Quercus, 2019. , set in 1928

Scott Manson novels 
 January Window. London: Head of Zeus, 23 October 2014.  
 Hand of God. London: Head of Zeus, 4 June 2015.  
 False Nine. London: Head of Zeus, 5 November 2015.

Stand alone novels 
A Philosophical Investigation. London: Chatto & Windus, 1992. 
Dead Meat. London: Chatto & Windus, 1993. 
Gridiron (vt US The Grid). London: Chatto & Windus, 1995. 
Esau. London: Chatto & Windus, 1996. 
A Five Year Plan. London: Hutchinson, 1997. 
The Second Angel. London: Orion, 1998. 
The Shot. London: Orion, 1999. 
Dark Matter: The Private Life of Sir Isaac Newton. New York: Crown, 2002. 
Hitler's Peace. New York: Marian Wood, 2005. 
Prayer. London: Quercus, 2013. 
The Winter Horses. New York: Knopf, 2014. 
 Research. London: Quercus, 2014. 
 1984.4. Hamburg: Rowohlt Verlag, 2021.

Non fiction 
The Penguin Book of Lies. 1991;1996
The Penguin Book of Fights, Feuds and Heartfelt Hatreds: An Anthology of Antipathy. 1992;1993

Children's fiction (as P. B. Kerr)

Children of the Lamp 
The Akhenaten Adventure. London: Scholastic Press, 2004. 
The Blue Djinn of Babylon. London: Scholastic Press, 2005.  
The Cobra King of Kathmandu. London: Scholastic Press, 2006.  
The Day of the Djinn Warriors. London: Scholastic Press, 2007.  
The Eye of the Forest. London: Scholastic Press, 2009.  
The Five Fakirs of Faizabad. London: Scholastic Press, 2010.
The Grave Robbers of Genghis Khan. London: Scholastic Press, 2011.

Stand alone fiction 
One Small Step. London: Simon & Schuster, 2008 (paper). 
 The Most Frightening Story Ever Told. New York: Alfred A. Knopf, 2016. 
 Friedrich der Große Detektiv (Frederick the Great Detective). Rowohlt Verlag, 2017.

Notes

External links 
 Official Philip Kerr website
 Bernie Gunther fansite
 Interview in Shotsmag Ezine 2011
 Interview with Philip Kerr about Kerr's relationship with Berlin.

1956 births
2018 deaths
Alumni of the University of Birmingham
Barry Award winners
Writers from Edinburgh
People educated at Stewart's Melville College
Scottish science fiction writers
Scottish crime fiction writers
Techno-thriller writers
Writers of historical mysteries